Aranui High School was a large secondary school for years 9–13, in Christchurch, New Zealand. Aranui high school took its name from the suburb of Aranui, meaning 'big pathway' in Māori. Aranui High School was a coeducational alternative to other secondary schools in Eastern Christchurch such as Linwood College and Mairehau High School.

Despite its name, it is located in the suburb of Wainoni. As part of the government's restructure of Christchurch schools following the 2011 Christchurch earthquake, the school's closure was announced in 2013. It closed in December 2016, and Haeata Community Campus, a school taking year 1-13 pupils was opened on the campus from a merger of Aranui High School with Aranui, Wainoni and Avondale primary schools.

History
Established in 1960, the school quickly grew into one of Christchurch's largest secondary schools, with a peak roll of over 1600 students.

The school became a key community hub and helped to educate not only local Maori and Pasifika students, but also Pakeha and other ethnicities well beyond the Aranui community limits.

During the magnitude 6.3 earthquake on 22 February, the school suffered only moderate damage but was forced to close for nearly a month. As a result of the earthquake the school experienced a significant decline in enrollment.

In 2013, Education Minister Hekia Parata announced that Aranui High School would be merged with local primary schools, including Wainoni, Aranui and Avondale Primary, to form a year 1-13 community campus. Aranui High School closed on 15 December 2016.

Houses

Kahikatea
Kauri
Kowhai
Rimu

Notable alumni

Ben Franks, rugby player
Keri Hulme, writer
Miriama Kamo, television presenter, host and producer
Stacey Morrison, TV and radio host
Lea Tahuhu, cricketer

References

External links
 http://www.aranui-high.school.nz

Secondary schools in Christchurch
Educational institutions established in 1960
1960 establishments in New Zealand
Defunct schools in New Zealand
Educational institutions disestablished in 2016
2016 disestablishments in New Zealand